The Office of Cannabis Management is a state agency established upon passage of the Marijuana Regulation and Taxation Act (MRTA) to implement a regulatory framework for medical and adult-use cannabis in the state of New York, along with hemp regulations as well. It was announced by Governor Andrew Cuomo in the January 2019 State of the State address. The office is charged with the regulation and taxation of the cannabis industry in the State of New York, following the legalization of recreational cannabis which was signed into law by Governor Cuomo on March 31, 2021. Tax revenue taken in by the agency was estimated by the Governor to start at $83 million in 2021 and rise to $300 million at full implementation in 2023.

On September 1, 2021, Governor Kathy Hochul nominated Drug Policy Alliance policymaker Chris Alexander for Executive Director and Assemblywoman Tremaine Wright for Chair of the Cannabis Control Board. Both were confirmed by a Senate vote. The New York State Assembly and New York State Senate later appointed two other Cannabis Control Board members, Adam W. Perry and former state senator Jen Metzger, respectively.

References

External links
 
 Division of Alcoholic Beverage Control in the New York Codes, Rules and Regulations (Chapter II of Subtitle B of Title 9 of the NYCRR)
Cannabis Law as amended in the Consolidated Laws of New York

Cannabis Management
Office of Cannabis Management
2019 in cannabis
Cannabis regulatory agencies